Voronzha is a rural locality (a selo) in Bolshesazansky Selsoviet of Seryshevsky District, Amur Oblast, Russia. The population was 49 as of 2018. There is 1 street.

Geography 
Voronzha is located 31 km northwest of Seryshevo (the district's administrative centre) by road. Bolshaya Sazanka is the nearest rural locality.

References 

Rural localities in Seryshevsky District